The Simp and the Sophomores is a 1915 silent comedy film featuring Oliver Hardy.

Cast
 Raymond McKee - Percy Quince
 Harry Eytinge - Professor Stout
 Arthur Housman - Tom Haze
 Oliver Hardy - Professor Arm. Strong (as O.N. Hardy)
 Jean Dumar - Alice Fields

See also
 List of American films of 1915
 Oliver Hardy filmography

External links

1915 films
American silent short films
American black-and-white films
1915 comedy films
1915 short films
Silent American comedy films
American comedy short films
1910s American films